Justin Torrey (born January 3, 1983) is an American mixed martial artist currently competing in the Middleweight division of the World Series of Fighting. A professional competitor since 2003, he has formerly competed for Bellator.

Background
Torrey has served as a U.S. Marine in Iraq.

Torrey also suffered a car accident, which has kept him away from mixed martial arts for a long period between 2010 and 2013.

Mixed martial arts career

Early career
Torrey started his professional career in 2003. He fought only for Massachusetts-based organization Mass Destruction, amassing a record of three victories and no losses.

Extreme Fighting International
After years absent from mixed martial arts, Torrey fought against Elias Rivera on April 14, 2007, at EFI: Uprising. He defeated Rivera via knockout in the first round.

Torrey next faced Alexandre Moreno on August 25, 2008, at EFI: International Beatdown for the middleweight title. He won via TKO in the first round and became the EFI middleweight champion.

Bellator Fighting Championships
Torrey made his promotional debut against Matt Makowski on June 12, 2009, at Bellator 11. He won via unanimous decision.

Torrey faced Lance Everson on May 6, 2010, at Bellator 17. He won via TKO in round two.

Torrey was expected to face Andreas Spång in the quarterfinal match of Bellator season nine middleweight tournament on September 7, 2013, at Bellator 98. However, Spång had to pull out due to undisclosed reasons and Torrey instead faced Brennan Ward at the same event. Torrey had his first career's defeat via TKO in the second round.

Torrey was released from Bellator on August 25, 2014.

World Series of Fighting
Torrey made his debut for the World Series of Fighting promotion on October 17, 2015, at WSOF 24.  He faced Rex Harris and lost the bout via split decision.

Championships and accomplishments

Mixed martial arts
Extreme Fighting International
EFI middleweight title (one time)

Mixed martial arts record

|-
| Loss
|align=center|7–2
|Rex Harris
|Decision (split)
|WSOF 24
|
|align=center|3
|align=center|5:00
|Mashantucket, Connecticut, United States
| 
|-
|Loss
|align=center|7–1
|Brennan Ward
|TKO (punches)
|Bellator 98
|
|align=center|2
|align=center|3:28
|Uncasville, Connecticut, United States
|
|-
|Win
|align=center|7–0
|Lance Everson
|TKO (punches)
|Bellator 17
|
|align=center|2
|align=center|3:55
|Boston, Massachusetts, United States
|
|-
|Win
|align=center|6–0
|Matt Makowski
|Decision (unanimous)
|Bellator 11
|
|align=center|3
|align=center|5:00
|Uncasville, Connecticut, United States
|
|-
|Win
|align=center|5–0
|Alexandre Moreno
|TKO (punches)
|EFI: International Beatdown
|
|align=center|1
|align=center|4:34
|Springfield, Massachusetts, United States
|
|-
|Win
|align=center|4–0
|Elias Rivera
|KO (punch)
|EFI: Uprising
|
|align=center|1
|align=center|N/A
|Springfield, Massachusetts, United States
|
|-
|Win
|align=center|3–0
|Louis Hicks
|TKO (punches)
|Mass Destruction 17
|
|align=center|2
|align=center|N/A
|Boston, Massachusetts, United States
|
|-
|Win
|align=center|2–0
|Mat Santos
|TKO (punches)
|Mass Destruction 15
|
|align=center|1
|align=center|3:37
|Boston, Massachusetts, United States
|
|-
|Win
|align=center|1–0
|Brian Knoth
|KO (punches)
|Mass Destruction 14
|
|align=center|1
|align=center|N/A
|Taunton, Massachusetts, United States
|

References

1983 births
Living people
United States Marine Corps personnel of the Iraq War
Sportspeople from Springfield, Massachusetts
American male mixed martial artists
Mixed martial artists from Massachusetts
Middleweight mixed martial artists
United States Marines